Sang Chal (also Romanized as Sang Chāl) is a village in Chelav Rural District, in the Central District of Amol County, Mazandaran Province, Iran. At the 2006 census, its population was 187, in 51 families.

Population 
This village is located in Chalav district and according to the latest census of the Statistics Center of Iran in 2006, its population is 187 people (51 families) as permanent residents. They use the title of summer villa and according to the information collected from the residents of this village, based on the population of the tribe, it is announced that about 35,000 people.

References 
3. SangChal Travel To Iran 

Populated places in Amol County